Albay's 4th congressional district is a defunct congressional district that encompassed the island of Catanduanes, a former territory of the province of Albay. It was represented in the House of Representatives of the Philippine Islands from 1931 to 1935, in the National Assembly of the Philippine Commonwealth from 1935 to 1941, and in the House of Representatives of the Philippine Commonwealth from 1945 to 1946. It was created by the 1929 reapportionment that redrew the boundaries of Albay's 2nd congressional district and allocated an additional district for the seven municipalities that comprised the island. Following the reorganization of a provincial government in Catanduanes in 1945, the district was dissolved and replaced by Catanduanes's at-large congressional district.

Representation history

See also
Legislative districts of Albay

References

Former congressional districts of the Philippines
Politics of Albay
1929 establishments in the Philippines
1946 disestablishments in the Philippines
Congressional districts of the Bicol Region